Officially registered on 1 August 1990, the United Firefighters Union of Australia (UFUA) represents over 7000 paid firefighters.

Branches of the United Firefighters Union of Australia are as follows:

- UFU Australian Capital Territory

- UFU Aviation

- UFU South Australia

- UFU Tasmania

- UFU Victoria

- UFU Western Australia

UFUA New South Wales union split 
Following a dispute over National Office finances, the UFU NSW branch (with 6000 members, the largest branch) restarted as an independent union and had won over 85 percent of all NSW paid firefighters by late 2010.

Queensland firefighters have also abandoned the UFUA, also describing them as a failed organisation.

References

External links
 United Firefighters Union of Australia Official Website.

Firefighters associations
Trade unions established in 1990
1990 establishments in Australia
Firefighting in Australia
Australian Public Sector Trade Unions